The Our Lady of Fátima Church Macau is a church in Nossa Senhora de Fátima, Macau, China.

History
The church was rebuilt in 1967.

Architecture

The church has a contemporary design with a square tower with two bells.
The design of the Church of Our Lady of Fatima was commissioned by bishop of Macau Dom Paulo Tavares in 1965. The original project was to build a church and a school on two adjacent sites. By 1965 the Bishop told the architect that one of the sites was no longer available. The dilemma then was how to build a church and a school on a site designated for the church. Architect Antonio M. Jorge da Silva suggested that the school could be built below the church building, but the compromise would be that the access to the church would have many more steps. The suggestion and  design was approved by the Bishop on condition that the project would be of low cost. To reduce the cost and to maintain a reasonable height in the interior of the church the structural beams were inverted to be on the roof leaving the interior ceiling free of beams. The church was to have been constructed with two colors of concrete to avoid future painting. The addition of a black cement admix would make the church beams and exterior panels a medium grey leaving the curved under panels over the windows almost white.

The Church of Our Lady of Fatima was completed and inaugurated on the 7th of December 1968.

Activities
The church regularly hold masses in the morning in Cantonese.

See also
 List of tourist attractions in Macau
 Christianity in Macau

References

External links

  

1967 establishments in Macau
Macau Peninsula
Roman Catholic churches in Macau